Wingellina or Irrunytju Community is a small Indigenous Australian community in Western Australia located about  north east of Perth near the Western Australian-South Australian border in the Goldfields–Esperance region of Western Australia.

Surrounded by large granite hills with mulga and mallee country, the community maintains many traditional activities such as hunting and gathering bush tucker as well as making many carved wooden artefacts.

The community is situated 12 km south west of the Surveyor Generals Corner near the NT-SA-WA border in the Gibson and Great Victoria deserts.

History 
The community was established in the 1980s and was composed mainly of people from the Warburton mission. These people still have spiritual and ancestral ties to many parts of the region. Like other communities in the area, many came from South Australia because of rocket testing at Woomera.

Town planning 
Wingellina Layout Plan No.1 has been prepared in accordance with State Planning Policy 3.2 Aboriginal Settlements. It currently exists in draft format only, having not been endorsed by the community. The map set is viewable at Planning Western Australia's website.

Native title 
The community is located within the determined Ngaanyatjarra Lands (Part A) native title claim (WC04/3).

References

External links 
Native Title Claimant application summary

Shire of Ngaanyatjarraku
Aboriginal communities in Goldfields-Esperance